The 2020-21 Punjab State Super Football League was the 34th season of the Punjab State Super Football League, the top-tier football league in the Indian state of Punjab.  Punjab Police are the champions. The league commenced from 19 December  2020.
Punjab Police FC, who were runners up last season, became champions this year.

Teams
A total number of 7 teams participated in the league. Last season champions Punjab FC didn't participated.

Standings

References

Punjab State Super Football League